Centrosomal protein of 192 kDa, also known as Cep192, is a protein that in humans is encoded by the CEP192 gene. It is the homolog of the C. elegans and D. melanogaster gene SPD-2.

Cep192 is a major regulator of pericentriolar material recruitment, centrosome maturation, and centriole duplication in mammalian cells. It stimulates the formation of the scaffolding upon which gamma tubulin ring complexes and other proteins involved in microtubule nucleation and spindle assembly become functional during mitosis.

References

External links

Further reading

Centrosome